The Litter Act 1979 is an Act of Parliament in New Zealand. This Act is administered by the Department of Internal Affairs.

See also
 Litter in New Zealand
The Litter Act was established to make better provision for the abatement and control of litter. The Act is a basic mechanism for local government to prevent littering.

The functions of the Act include:
 establishing enforcement officers and litter wardens who may issue fines and abatement notices for litter offences
 allowing territorial authorities to force the removal of litter
 allowing public authorities to make by-laws pursuant to the provisions of the Act.

This Act is administered by the Ministry for the Environment.

References

External links
 Litter Act 1979 – text of the Act

Statutes of New Zealand
1979 in New Zealand law
Litter
1979 in the environment
Environmental law in New Zealand